This is a list of national nature reserves of China.

See also
List of protected areas of China

China
China

China geography-related lists
Nature conservation in China
Heritage registers in China
Nature reserves